Cybermorph is a shooter video game developed by Attention to Detail and published by Atari Corporation for the Atari Jaguar first in North America on November 23, 1993, where it was included as the pack-in game for the console when it launched. It was later released in Europe on June 23, 1994 and finally in Japan as a stand-alone release on December 15 of the same year, where it was published by Mumin Corporation.

The player takes control of a morphing fighter craft prototype named the Transmogriffon (shortened to TGriffon during the game's mission briefs), with an on-board artificial intelligence called Skylar, to battle in The Galactic War against the Pernitia Empire, who have seized information and supplies of the Resistance into pods within planets dominated by them that need to be freed to defeat the empire. Being one of the first titles released for the system, Cybermorph is widely believed to have been originally in development for the Atari Panther and ported to the Jaguar when the project was terminated by Atari Corp., instead the project originated as a demo for the abandoned Konix Multisystem console. Two versions of the game were released, with minor differences between them; the pack-in version (copyrighted 1993 on the label) is a two-megabyte (MB) cartridge, while the later version (copyrighted 1994 on the label) is a one MB cartridge, which excludes the introduction and ending animation sequences and has fewer voice samples compared to the original release.

Cybermorph received divisive reviews when it launched, with critics praising the graphics, semi-open ended levels and gameplay, while others criticized the sound quality, lack of in-game music, repetitive nature of the missions and Skylar herself for not being helpful and constantly reminding players when they crash into objects. Critics also compared the game with Star Fox, which was released months prior on the SNES. Nevertheless, the game was named "Viewpoint Game of the Month" by GameFan. By April 1, 1995, the stand-alone version has sold nearly 2,000 copies though it is unknown how many were sold in total during its lifetime. A sequel, Battlemorph, was released in December 1995 for the Atari Jaguar CD, taking place 30 years after the events occurred in this game.

Gameplay 

Cybermorph is a semi-open 3D shooter game where the player pilots the T-Griffon on a third-person perspective with the main objective of recapturing critical pods spread out across eight different planets in five sectors to explore, fight against the robotic forces of The Pernitia Empire and defeat them, with a boss at the end of each sector. A hidden sixth sector is accessible via cheat code and progress is kept via password, as the cartridge's internal EEPROM only saves high-scores and other settings.

The player can tackle any of the eight planets  on each sector in any order, each one showing mission briefing before being launched into the level. Although the game is mission-oriented, players can explore the levels to find secrets and hidden areas within. Some of the levels have Vortex Towers, which destroys pods brought by Pod Carriers within the generated antimatter and if enough pods are destroyed, the player will be forced to restart the level. Other obstacles are also introduced in later levels such as bunkers. Teleporters are placed in later levels and warps the player into unreachable areas within the level.

Weapon and Super Weapon power-ups are randomly dropped by enemies and can be collected to expand the ship's arsenal and they can be stocked until it reaches a set number but Cargo Carriers also have weapons. Coins are also dropped by enemies as well but they only give points except those marked with X, which grants an extra life. The T-Griffon also changes its shape depending on the player's control actions and weapons. Crashing into mountains damages the ship, while crashing with building at high speed either on front or in reverse instantly destroys the ship. By pressing 4 on the controller keypad, the player toggles on or off a cross-hair. Pressing 5, 7, 8 & 9 on the keypad changes the fixed camera angle respectively while pressing 6 changes the perspective from third-person into first-person.

Plot 
The Galactic War has begun and robots that can automatically rebuild themselves have been created as ultimate weapons by the Pernitia Empire, who keeps adding planets from multiple sectors to their growing empire and their regenerative technology becomes entrenched permanently into them. The Resistance have developed new weapons to defeat the pernitians but they were captured alongside supplies, useful information and key designers of the resistance forces that were cryogenically suspended and were all put inside pods and placed into conquered planets of the empire. The player is assigned to recover the pods so that the resistance fighters can have all of the necessary elements to stop the empire from spreading and free planets conquered by the pernitians by piloting the only fighter craft prototype left: The Cybermorph TransmoGriffon morphing attack craft, or T-Griffon for short, which is transported by intersolar cruisers and only usable in planetary territory. It also uses similar technology used by the pernitians and comes equipped with Skylar, a holographic intelligence agent designed to give mission and battle information. After recovering multiple pods and setting free the planets from multiple sectors, the player is sent into the last pernitian stronghold to destroy the multiple battle stations and recover the last pods within. After recovering all the critical pods and cleared the sectors, the Resistance manages to defeat the Pernitia Empire.

Development and release 

Attention to Detail, or ATD for short, was founded in September 1988 by University of Birmingham graduates Chris Gibbs, Fred Gill, Martin Green, Jon Steele and Jim Torjussen. The newly formed team was approached by their mentor Jon Dean for work on the Atari 2600 but it was cancelled. Jon later approached the team once again, now in regards to the Konix Multisystem, and the team worked alongside Flare Technology on the operating system, development tools and demos in order to make development easy and attract third-party developers for the then-upcoming system. Among the many demo programs developed by ATD for the Konix Multisystem was a flying carpet demo, which was created from scratch in 11 days and was based on Zarch (also known as Virus). Atari Corp. liked it and approached the team to create demos for the then-upcoming Jaguar. This demo became the starting point for Cybermorph'''s development.

Faran Thomason, who is best known as the producer of both Bubsy in Fractured Furry Tales and Warlocked for the Game Boy Color, worked as a level designer and tester for the game. He stated that when the game was showcased in Atari Corp.'s US offices it was in a very basic state, consisting of only the ship flying and a rudimentary Gouraud-shaded terrain. The testing department at Atari was tasked to implement levels and structures in the game, while ATD laid down the terrain and enemies via a rudimentary editor the Atari testing team would use to implement them into the game. Cybermorph was first showcased at Atari's August 1993 press conference at Sunnyvale, California in an early but playable state. A 1993 promotional recording sent by Atari to video game retail stores features the game in a much earlier state with many differences compared to the final release. B.J. West, who worked as an animator in Trevor McFur in the Crescent Galaxy, created both the cover art and ending sequence for the game. Sean Patter, producer of both Cybermorph and Iron Soldier, stated that by bringing the testing team to design game resulted in a lot of work but he remarked that by doing so resulted in making it into "a much better game in the long run". Several other members at Atari were also involved with its production.Cybermorph makes use of the various hardware features found within the Jaguar such as Z-buffering, which is used in multiple enemies of the game to various effects. In addition, Z-buffering is also used to handle drawing of all the objects and the planetary terrain. It also runs between 10-18 frames per second and displays around 6000 polygons on-screen. Gouraud shading is also used as a light source for all the polygon models, while the system's Motorola 68000 is used to move all of the objects in the game. The voice of Skylar was provided by Victoria Lowe, wife of video game composer David Lowe.Cybermorph was first released as the pack-in game for the Atari Jaguar when it launched on in North America on November 23, 1993. The game was later released in Europe on June 23, 1994, and finally in Japan as a stand-alone release on December 15 of the same year, where it was published by Mumin Corporation. Later versions of the game published in 1994 were stored on a one-megabyte cartridge and has several features missing from the original 1993 version such as the introduction and ending animation sequences, as well as additional voice samples. The cutting of these features in the one-megabyte version was a cost-effective measure Atari Corp. made in order to boost sales of the system, taking approximately two hours for the team to remove them in order to fit the game from a 2MB cart onto a 1MB cart. Fred Gill stated that "whilst an interesting engineering exercise, it was painful ‘mutilating’ something that we'd crafted over such a long time". It remained as a bundled title for the console. The game was included as part of the Atari 50: The Anniversary Celebration compilation for Nintendo Switch, PlayStation 4, Steam, and Xbox One, marking its first re-release.

 Reception Cybermorph divided reviewers. Some found the pod-collecting gameplay to be dull and ultimately repetitive, while others saw it as varied and challenging due to the number of different enemies and obstacles. The usage of Gouraud shading was widely praised, but the graphics were generally regarded as a disappointment given the Jaguar's capabilities, due primarily to the simplistic, untextured shapes. A reviewer for Edge explained, "It all moves dead smoothly but, to be honest, the 3D ships and buildings are all a bit basic, made of simple shapes with gaudy colour schemes. There's little of the finesse that you find with simulators like TFX, and even Starwing contains much more interesting enemies."

Unfavorable comparisons to the Super NES's similarly polygon-based shooter Star Fox (titled Starwing in Europe, where Edge was published) came up frequently in reviews. Joe Santulli, for example, remarked in Digital Press that "Starfox is ten times better than this game - and Silpheed, a game that I really thought was all glitz, is easily superior to Cybermorph in terms of graphics and sound. So what gives here?"

The audio came as a bigger disappointment than the graphics, with several critics complaining at the absence of in-game music and the sound effects, which they found dated even by the standards of the previous generation. The four reviewers of Electronic Gaming Monthly particularly emphasized the audio's poor quality, with Sushi-X elaborating: "My first impression was that the sound wasn't turned up because the effects were so subdued. After you get through the tinny intro music, you are left with simple beeps." However, a few critics felt the game successfully delivered on the Jaguar's promise. Simon Clays wrote in Atari ST User that "I've never been overcome in quite the manner I was when I saw Cybermorph. More than anything it demonstrated the sheer power of the machine and its immediate superiority to anything else you'll see." Some critics particularly argued that in-game music was not called for, as it would have become annoying over the lengthy campaigns and detracted from the game's atmosphere.

Otherwise, the more positive reviews for Cybermorph tended to emphasize its gameplay rather than its audio-visual performance. The Edge reviewer countered his own criticisms of the graphics by adding that "in the final assessment, it's gameplay that counts and Cybermorph has nothing to fear in that department. From the first firebutton press, it's pretty much non-stop action, and even though there's no timer, the game comes with a built-in sense of panic as you attempt to scoop up all the pods and haul ass outta there." Boss Music of GamePro had a more mixed reaction, citing an intriguing gameplay concept but repetitive action, blocky and untextured graphics, and "a deterring level of challenge". Deniz Ahmet of Computer and Video Games assessed, "Visually, it looks stunning, but there isn't much interaction. The enemy craft are easily disposed of and once the novelty of exploring the shaded terrains has gone all you find is a repetitive game. This wouldn't matter in an action game like Star Wing, but it does in the tactical approach used by Cybermorph."

The title received a "Viewpoint Game Of the Month" award from GameFan, who also gave the game one of its most enthusiastic reviews. Lauding the open world environments, level design, massive length, and real-time 3D graphics, the reviewer said that after his first play session with Cybermorph, "I emerged, totally fulfilled, with the strange feeling that after playing video games for 9 years I had just played the first 'real one'." By April 1, 1995, the stand-alone version of the game has sold nearly 2,000 copies though it is unknown how many were sold in total during its lifetime.

 Legacy 
A sequel, Battlemorph, had already been announced for the Atari Jaguar CD by the time Cybermorph hit the market. It was released in 1995 in all regions, to positive reception. During the same year, the game's trademark was abandoned.

Skylar appears as a boss on the stage Future Fuckballs 2010 in the 2013 game Angry Video Game Nerd Adventures'' for Nintendo 3DS, Steam and Wii U.

References

External links 
 Cybermorph (2MB) at AtariAge
 Cybermorph (1MB) at AtariAge
 Cybermorph at GameFAQs
 Cybermorph at MobyGames

1993 video games
Atari games
Atari Jaguar games
Attention to Detail games
Commercial video games with freely available source code
Pack-in video games
Science fiction video games
Shooter video games
Single-player video games
Video games developed in the United Kingdom
Video games scored by David Lowe
Video games set in outer space
Video games set in the future